Nsukwa is an Anioma community settled in the Aniocha South area of Delta State, Nigeria.

References 

Populated places in Delta State